Mary Grace delos Reyes Perido (born September 1, 1992), better known Louise delos Reyes, is a Filipino actress and model. She left GMA Network in May 2017 and signed a 5 year-managerial contract with Viva which made her comeback on ABS-CBN and appeared on Ang Probinsyano and Asintado.

Life and career
Delos Reyes was 8 years old when she started her acting career in the show Ang TV 2 using her real name Grace. She was then a cast in Ang Iibigin ay Ikaw and had been a contract artist of GMA until early 2004 and stopped to focus on her studies. She returned to TV as part of the cast of Lipgloss in TV5. She also played a lead role in the Peque Gallaga indie film Agaton and Mindy, which earned her a Best New Movie Actress nomination from PMPC. Before her TV career, she has won beauty contests including Ms. Lyceum of the Philippines University — Cavite 2010, Ms. Teen Philippines International — Luzon 2007, Ms. Jag Teen 2007 and Ms. Teen Super Ferry 2007.

In 2010, Delos Reyes had her first acting stint in GMA as Maricel Soriano's daughter in Pilyang Kerubin. She was then cast in Reel Love Presents: Tween Hearts  and got her very first lead role in Alakdana. She had played in several movies and co-starred with Kathryn Bernardo in a 2011 horror movie Parola: Shake, Rattle & Roll 13. Delos Reyes was also a cast in My Beloved headlined by Marian Rivera and Dingdong Dantes and got her first break in 2012 as she play the lead role Elize in the GMA7 primetime drama One True Love with Alden Richards.
The success of Richards and Delos Reyes tandem was followed by another top-rating show Mundo Mo'y Akin in 2013. She also got her degree in Foreign Service, came back in doing indie film via Island Dreams on the same year. In 2014, she headlined Kambal Sirena portraying a dual role as human/mermaid. Delos Reyes made a TV comeback as Pepay in GMA's Afternoon Prime drama Magkaibang Mundo in 2016 and starred in Baka Bukas. By early 2017, she left GMA Artist Center and signed a 5-year managerial contract with VIVA Artists Agency.

She returned to her former network, ABS-CBN, and is also seen in the Sari-Sari Channel.

Filmography

Film

Television

Music videos

Awards and nominations

References

External links

 
 Louise delos Reyes Official

1992 births
Living people
People from Tanza, Cavite
Filipino beauty pageant winners
Filipino female models
Actresses from Cavite
Star Magic
ABS-CBN personalities
GMA Network personalities
TV5 (Philippine TV network) personalities
Viva Artists Agency
Lyceum of the Philippines University alumni
Filipina gravure idols